The 2018 Canadian Soccer League season was the 21st season under the Canadian Soccer League name. The season began on May 13, 2018, and concluded on October 13, 2018, with the CSL Championship final held at Centennial Park Stadium in Toronto, Ontario. FC Vorkuta won their first championship by defeating Scarborough SC in a penalty shootout. Vorkuta found further success in the Second Division by winning their first CSL double after defeating Halton United in the finals. Meanwhile FC Ukraine United claimed the First Division title. 

The First Division saw an increase to 9 teams, while the Second Division decreased in size to 6 teams. The First Division returned to the territories of Hamilton, Mississauga, and the promotion of FC Ukraine United. While new entries to the Second Division included the return of Milton SC and the debut of Scarborough SC's reserve squad.

Summary  
The main narrative of the season was the race for the First Division title between FC Ukraine United and FC Vorkuta. The outcome was determined on the final match of the season with Ukraine United edging Vorkuta out with a higher goal differential by five goals. Though Vorkuta would achieve success in the postseason by claiming its first CSL Championship. The organization made further advances in the Second Division as its reserve squad secured the double (division title and DII Championship). In preparation for the season, Vorkuta managed to secure Ukraine United's general manager Denys Yanchuk and continued in the club's practice of foreign recruitment from the Ukrainian football market. 

After producing a perfect season in the Second division Ukraine United returned to the top division in 2018. Andrei Malychenkov resumed his coaching duties and retained the majority of his previous roster with additional imports from the Ukraine. From the onset of the season, the club remained highly competitive and battled with rivals Vorkuta for supremacy of the division. Vorkuta held the top position for sixteen consecutive weeks until Ukraine United usurped the position for the final five weeks of the season. The western Toronto team ultimately reached the second round of the playoffs and succumbed to Scarborough SC.      

The third position in the First Division was a highly contested spot with Hamilton City, Scarborough SC, Serbian White Eagles, and SC Waterloo Region competing with one another. The White Eagles achieved a five-game undefeated streak and held the spot for two weeks. Shortly their performance dwindled and fluctuated between the fourth and fifth position to conclude the season in the sixth spot. Following their mediocre 2017 season SC Waterloo named Radivoj Panić as the head coach, and assembled a roster with a mixture of league veterans with European imports from the Western Balkans. After a slow start to the season, the club rebounded to a seven-match undefeated streak and secured the third position on the final match of the regular season.             

Scarborough SC continued to develop as an elite club with Zoran Rajović being assigned head coach responsibilities. Rajović took advantage of the influx of European imports to the league, and a player agreement to acquire talent from York Region Shooters was negotiated. One notable re-signing was the return of Canadian international Adrian Cann as team captain. The acquisitions produced dividends for the eastern Toronto club as they held the coveted third position for the majority of the season for a total of sixteen weeks until forfeiting it on the final week to Waterloo on an account of a greater goal difference. In the postseason the club reached the championship final for the second consecutive season.                

After a year of hiatus from the league, Hamilton City returned under new management with Saša Vuković as owner and head coach. The club experienced a transitional stage with fewer imports from abroad and more reliance on talent from their previous reserve team. Hamilton managed to produce an average season enough to secure a playoff berth with just four points away from the third position. The final two postseason berths were secured by Brantford Galaxy and SC Real Mississauga. After the departure of Vukovic, the Galaxy brought in Milan Prpa as head coach and the team assembled by Prpa remained primarily the same as the previous seasons with many veterans returning. 

The season also witnessed the return of professional soccer to the Peel Region with CSC Mississauga and SC Real Mississauga representing the city of Mississauga. Real Mississauga, an academy founded by league veteran Krum Bibishkov, received a franchise in the CSL. They primarily competed with Brantford throughout the season and secured a playoff berth. CSC Mississauga struggled to make an impact as they remained at the bottom of the standings for the majority of the season. In the Second Division, Burlington SC was renamed Halton United and were the primary competitors to FC Vorkuta B. For eleven weeks Halton retained the second position and reached the championship final.

First Division

Changes from 2017
Club membership increased in the First Division from eight members to nine. Changes included the return of FC Ukraine United from the Second Division with further new additions from two Mississauga franchises CSC Mississauga and Real Mississauga SC. The division also saw the return of Hamilton City SC from its one-year hiatus under new club management. The York Region Shooters failed to feature an active squad for the season as owner Tony De Thomasis became involved with Unionville Milliken SC in League1 Ontario.

Teams

Standings

Positions by Round

Season Statistics

Goals

Updated: September 26, 2018

Hat-tricks

Playoffs

Quarterfinals

Semifinals

CSL Championship

Second Division

Changes from 2017 
The Second Division decreased in size to six-member as FC Ukraine United was promoted to the First Division, and Royal Toronto FC became inactive for the season. SC Waterloo B, London City were disbanded, and Milton SC returned to the Second Division. Another new entry was through Scarborough SC as they began operating a reserve team for the first time. Other changes included the renaming of Burlington SC to Halton United.

Teams

Standings

Positions by Round

Top Goal Scorers

Updated: September 26, 2018

Playoffs

Semifinals

Second Division Championship

Awards

Weekly awards

References 

Canadian Soccer League (1998–present) seasons
2018 domestic association football leagues
Canadian Soccer League